Palinurus barbarae is a species of spiny lobster described in 2006, which was found by fishermen working the waters above the Walters Shoals, a series of submerged mountains  south of Madagascar. There are fears that the species, which lives in an area outside any country's jurisdiction, may now be exploited, or that it has already been brought near to extinction by overfishing.

References

Achelata
Crustaceans described in 2006